The 2012 Rally México was the third round of the 2012 World Rally Championship (WRC) season. The rally took place between 8 and 11 March 2012.

Results

Event standings

*This team does not score points in the PWRC championship.

Special stages

Power Stage
The "Power stage" was a  stage at the end of the rally.

Championship standings after the event

Drivers' championship

Notes:
1 2 3 refers to the classification of the drivers on the 'Power Stage', where bonus points are awarded 3–2–1 for the fastest three drivers on the stage.

Manufacturers' championship

Notes:
† — The Mini WRC Team lost its manufacturer status in February when parent company BMW withdrew works support from the team, demoting them to customer team status. The team kept the points it scored on Rallye Monte Carlo although it was no longer classified as a manufacturer entrant. They were replaced by the WRC Team Mini Portugal as the official Mini works team.
‡ — Armindo Araújo World Rally Team and Palmeirinha Rally merged to form WRC Team Mini Portugal. The points they scored at the Rallye Monte Carlo were removed from the manufacturers' championship.

PWRC Drivers' championship

References

External links
 The official website for the rally
 The official website of the World Rally Championship

Mexico
Rally Mexico
Rally